Greedy may refer to:


Music
 Greedy (album), a 1997 album by Headless Chickens
 "Greedy" (song), a song on the album Dangerous Woman by Ariana Grande
 "Greedy", a single by Canadian rock band Pure
 "Greedy", a song on the album Mass Nerder by the punk rock band All
 "Greedy", a song on the album Lyfe 268‒192 by Lyfe Jennings
 "Greedy", a song on the album Training Day by The Away Team
 "Greedy", a song on the mixtape Keep Flexin by Rich the Kid

People
 Greedy Smith (1956–2019), pseudonym of Andrew McArthur Smith, singer, musician and songwriter with the Australian pop/new wave band Mental As Anything
 Greedy Williams (born 1997), American football player nicknamed "Greedy"
 Jack Greedy (1929–1988), Canadian racing driver, member of the Canadian Motorsport Hall of Fame

Other uses
 Greedy algorithm, any algorithm that follows the problem-solving heuristic of making the locally optimal choice at each stage
 Greedy (film), a 1994 comedy
 Greedy Gretchen, a character who appeared in episodes of the American TV sitcoms Three's Company and Three's a Crowd
 Greedy Smurf, a character in The Smurfs franchise
 Mr. Greedy, title character of a book in the Mr. Men series
 Little Miss Greedy, title character of a book in the Little Miss series (related to the Mr. Men series)

See also

Greed (disambiguation)